The 2010 Calabrian regional election took place on 28–29 March 2010.

Giuseppe Scopelliti of The People of Freedom ousted by a landslide the incumbent President Agazio Loiero of the Democratic Party.Results

Elections in Calabria
2010 elections in Italy